Winter  is a Silly Symphonies animated Disney short film. It was released on October 30, 1930, by Columbia Pictures.

Summary 
Winter has come to the forest and the snow is falling. When the wind blows, animals sleep. When the wind stops blowing, the little trees and various animals dance and play. Various animals are ice skating. Some animals dance in duos, while others form large dance groups. When the wind returns, the animals take shelter.

Reception
The Film Daily (December 28, 1930): "This Disney Silly Symphony doesn't stand up with previous releases. The synchrony is well done and the animation up to the average but it lacks gags for laughs. Much snow, skating and sliding, with the usual animal antics for nothing particularly clever."

Home media
The short was released on December 19, 2006, on Walt Disney Treasures: More Silly Symphonies, Volume Two.

References

External links
 

1930 films
1930 short films
1930s Disney animated short films
Silly Symphonies
1930 animated films
Films directed by Burt Gillett
Films produced by Walt Disney
American black-and-white films
Columbia Pictures animated short films
Columbia Pictures short films
Animated films without speech
Films set in forests
1930s American films